Malebaka Flory Bulane is a member of the Pan-African Parliament from Lesotho.

References

Members of the Pan-African Parliament from Lesotho
Year of birth missing (living people)
Living people
Place of birth missing (living people)